El Jaguey Airport  is an airport serving El Jaguey, a coastal town in the La Unión Department of El Salvador.

The runway is crossways on a point (Punta de Amapala) at the entrance to the Gulf of Fonseca, and approaches to either end are over the water.

See also

Transport in El Salvador
List of airports in El Salvador

References

External links
OpenStreetMap - El Tamarindo
OurAirports - El Tamarindo Airport

Airports in El Salvador